Robert T. Fisher (December 3, 1888 – July 7, 1942) was an American football player and coach. He played college football at Harvard University and was a consensus All-American in 1910 and 1911. He served as the head football coach at Harvard from 1919 to 1925, compiling a record of 43–14–5 and winning the 1920 Rose Bowl. His 1919 team was retroactively recognized as a national champion by a number of selectors.  Fisher was one of the original trustees for the American Football Coaches Association (AFCA).  He was inducted into the College Football Hall of Fame as a player in 1973.

Playing career
Fisher was born on December 3, 1888 in Boston. He grew up in Dorchester and played tackle at Phillips Academy, where he was a teammate of John Kilpatrick. He played guard on Harvard’s freshman team in 1908 and on the varsity team from 1909 to 1911. He was captain of the 1911 Harvard Crimson football team. He was a second team All-American in 1909 and a consensus first team All-American in 1910 and 1911.

Military service
In 1917, Fisher was commissioned as a first lieutenant in the Aviation Section of the United States Army Signal Corps and assigned to the San Antonio Aviation General Supply Depot. In 1918 he was transferred to Wilbur Wright Field in Dayton, Ohio, where he was later promoted to captain. While at Wright he met Louise Winters and they married when he was discharged in March of 1919. The Fishers had four sons and one daughter. After the war, Fisher returned to C. F. Hovey.

Coaching
After graduating in 1912, Fisher went to work for the C. F. Hovey department store, but remained involved with the Crimson as an assistant football coach. On June 13, 1919 it was announced that he would succeed Percy Haughton as Harvard's head football coach. He was chosen after Haughton's lead assistant, Leo Leary, turned down the job to focus on his business interests. His 1919 team went undefeated and won the 1920 Rose Bowl over Oregon and was retroactively recognized as a national champion by the Helms Athletic Foundation and the Houlgate System, and as a co-national champion by the College Football Researchers Association, National Championship Foundation, and Parke H. Davis. The following year, Harvard went 8–0–1 and was retroactively named as the co-national champion by the Boand System, however the majority of selectors have chosen California as the national champion for 1920. In 1921, Harvard lost to Center College in what is widely considered one of the greatest upsets in college football history. 

On February 3, 1925, Fisher informed the Harvard Athletic Committee that he would not return as head coach. He was convinced to reconsider and on March 4, 1925 it was announced he would return as head coach. After the season, Fisher announced he would not return as head coach. Fisher compiled a record of 43–14–5 in his seven seasons as Harvard's coach. He had a 4–2–1 record in the Harvard–Yale game. He had less success in the annual game against Princeton, amassing a 1–4–2 record and losing by a combined score of 70 to 0 in his final two seasons as coach.

Later life
Fisher worked at Lee, Higginson & Co. until 1927, when he and Francis Ouimet were chosen to head the Boston office of the stock and commodities exchange house Harriss, Irby & Vose. In 1931 he joined Spencer Trask & Co. and in 1940 was promoted to manager. On July 7, 1942, Fisher died of a heart attack at Newton Hospital. He was survived by his wife, daughter, and four sons. Fisher's four sons played together at his alma mater, Phillips Academy and went on to play for Harvard. Three of them played together on the 1942 team while the fourth was unavailable due to military commitments. At the time of his death, Fisher resided in Weston, Massachusetts.

Head coaching record

References

External links
 

1888 births
1942 deaths
All-American college football players
American football guards
Coaches of American football from Massachusetts
College Football Hall of Fame inductees
Harvard Crimson football coaches
Harvard Crimson football players
Players of American football from Boston
Sportspeople from Boston
People from Weston, Massachusetts
People from Dorchester, Massachusetts
Phillips Academy alumni
United States Army Signal Corps personnel
United States Army personnel of World War I